Weird U.S. is a reality television series based on the book series of the same name. The program aired on The History Channel and starred Mark Moran and Mark Sceurman, founders of the magazine Weird NJ, as they hunt the United States looking for weird history, hauntings, and legends because, as they say, "history is full of weirdos." It is produced by Kralyevich Productions. It is also a series of paranormal travel guides edited by the same two individuals.

History
The pilot episode aired on October 31, 2004, on the History Channel. The pilot episode was an hour long. It started as a regular weekly series on August 1, 2005.

Series overview

Episodes

Pilot

Season 1

 Fact or Fiction
 Weird Underworld
 It's A Wonderful Time To Be Weird
 Creepy Curses
 Weird Waters
 Roadside Distractions
 This Odd House

DVD releases
A&E Home Video has released these DVD sets, along with other individual DVD episodes:

Title: Weird U.S., Vol. 1 (History Channel)
Episodes contained: Strange But True (pilot) and Road to Weirdsville
UPC: 733961745122
DVD Release Date: October 31, 2004
Run Time: 90 minutes
Title: Weird U.S., Vol. 2 (History Channel)
Episodes contained: Weird Worship and Weirdly Departed
UPC: 733961745139
DVD Release Date: November 15, 2005
Run Time: 90 minutes
Title: Weird U.S., Vol. 3 (History Channel)
Episodes contained: Rebels and Traitors and Crime and Punishment
UPC: 733961745146
DVD Release Date: February 28, 2006
Run Time: 90 minutes

References

External links
 
  at History.com
 
 Weird U.S. in Newsweek

2000s American reality television series
History (American TV channel) original programming
2004 American television series debuts
2005 American television series endings
Paranormal television